The Battle Creek Battle Jacks are a baseball team that plays in the Northwoods League, a collegiate summer baseball league.  All players on the team must have NCAA eligibility remaining in order to participate. Their home games are played at the C.O. Brown Stadium in Battle Creek, Michigan. Their name refers variously to a previous Battle Creek baseball team, the Michigan Battle Cats, to Apple Jacks manufactured by Battle Creek-based Kellogg's, and to a "Jack of All Trades" as someone with multiple skills. Also, a "jack" is another term for a home run, and Cracker Jacks are often eaten by baseball fans during the game.

Rivalry 
The Battle Jacks compete for the I-94 Rivalry Cup with the Kalamazoo Growlers. The rivalry began in 2014 when the Growlers entered the Northwoods League, joining the Battle Jacks as the only teams in the league from Michigan. The Growlers lead in the yearly series 5-3-1 and in the all-time series 55 games to 50, with 3 ties.

2007 season
The Battle Creek Bombers began play in 2007 as an expansion team in the Northwoods League.  First-year manager Brian Murphy guided the team to a record of 26-41.

Attendance for their first season was 27,946, Bombers website</ref> including a game on August 2, 2007, which was nationally televised on ESPNU and drew 4,087 fans in a 3–2 loss to the Rochester Honkers.

2008 season
Matt Fonteno became their manager for the 2008 season.

2008 total attendance grew slightly from 2007 to 29,497.  The Bombers finished the first half of the 2008 season in last place and they finished the second half in 6th place, missing the playoffs for the second straight season.

2009 season
Under guidance of new manager Tom Fleenor, the Bombers set a franchise record for wins in a season, going 37–30. The Bombers won 21 games in the first half of the season, finishing a game-and-a-half back of the Eau Claire Express. They finished four games back in the second half, barely missing out on the playoffs.

On the final night of the season, the Bombers drew a record crowd of 4,424 fans. Prior to the game, Chris Lewis was named team MVP. Lewis broke eight franchise records, and was in the top two of the league in seven offensive categories.

The Bombers sent a record seven players to the Northwoods League All-Star Game, and three of those players (Chris Lewis, Matt Talley, and R.J. Hively) were selected to the Northwoods League Postseason All-Star Team.

2011 season
The Battle Creek Bombers capped of their most successful season in franchise history hoisting the Northwoods League Championship trophy at C.O. Brown Stadium as they were crowned winners of the Summer Collegiate World Series.

The 2011 campaign began on uneven ground: a new general manager (Brian Colopy), new field manager (Donnie Scott), new pitching coach (Brandon Higelin), new logos, new front office employees, and new players. After a 2010 season in which the Bombers finished 20–50, Colopy brought back hitting coach Thad Frame of Huntington University and acquired a lineup of veteran local players mixed with younger players from big-name schools. For the majority of the season, Battle Creek's lineup consisted of players from Central Michigan University, Taylor University, Evansville University, Northern Illinois, Western Illinois, Texas-San Antonio, and Miami (Ohio).

The Bombers jumped out to an early Southern Division lead, and did not lose a series until nearly three weeks into the regular season.  The success continued, and after a down-to-the-wire race for the first-half championship, the Bombers clinched their playoff berth based on head-to-head records after tying Eau Claire and Green Bay for the best record.

Scott led the team to a second-half championship and home field advantage in the divisional series against second place finisher Green Bay. After finishing 30 games under .500 in 2010, the team finished the regular season 43–26. Battle Creek faced their Southern Division rival, Green Bay, in the Southern Division playoff, and the Bombers took the pennant in two straight games before doing the same in the Northwoods League championship against the Northern Division's Mankato Moondogs. Including the championship win, the Bombers finished the 2011 season on an 11-game winning streak, and never lost more than three games in a row through the 73-game season.

With the Bombers 47–26 overall record, they officially completed the largest turnaround in the Northwoods Leagues 18-year history.  The team improved their record by a 27 games in 2011, besting the former record of 19 set in 1995 when the Kenosha Kroakers improved their 21–31 record to 40–18. Bryce Redeker broke the previous team home run record when he hit 11 during the 2011 campaign (most of which came in Battle Creek, the league's deepest field); Jordan Dean set records for hits (89), doubles, and at-bats; Danny Rockett bought in a franchise-high 53 runs batted in; and Martinez finished second in the NWL in walks (53), a team record.

Not only did Battle Creek see success on the field, attendances numbers reached an all-time high at 1,176 fans per game in 2011, a 49% increase over the previous season's 778 fans a game.

2012 season
The Bombers attempted to defend their first ever Northwoods League championship with new coaches taking the reins of the on-field squad. Former pitching coach Brandon Higelin took over for former manager Donnie Scott. New coaches joining Higelin's staff were Joseph Ramos and Brad Gschwind. The Bombers ended their season with 26 wins and 43 losses.

2013 season 
The Bombers finished their 2013 season with a team record of 29 wins to 41 losses. Higelin returned as manager and Joseph Oliveira, Cody Piechocki, and Chris Smith joined the staff as hitting coach, pitching coach, and assistant coach, respectively. The Bombers had an active roster of 18 players from 12 different NCAA universities.

2014 season 
The 2014 team finished 32–40. Higelin returned as manager and Jimmy Correnti joined the staff as the assistant coach. Bill Murphy and Robbie Robinson took over for Higgling as manager. The Bombers also began new stadium renovations at C. O. Brown Stadium that increased stadium capacity.

2015 season 
Under the direction of field manager Robbie Robinson, the Bombers ended the 2015 season with a record of 27–44. Although the team took a step back from the 2014 season, they managed to still stay ahead of rival Kalamazoo in the final standings.

Dan Swain and Niko Pacheco led the team with five home runs each. Alex Hermeling was the ace of the team and was selected to the Northwoods League all-star team. He led the team with 52 strikeouts in 53.2 innings. He was later drafted by the Los Angeles Dodgers.

2016 season 
The Battle Creek Bombers hired of Gary McClure as manager for the 2016 season. They also revealed a new mascot design on April 17 at a public event at C.O. Brown Stadium.

Further changes included major ballpark renovations that reduced the seating capacity from more than 4,000 to 2,300. The renovation included the introduction of a new "Home Plate Club," which features 10 granite half-moon tables situated directly behind home plate. Each table also has four stadium chairs sourced from Camden Yards. Each table has access to its own menu, including both beer and wine pairings. "The Champions Club," runs down the first and third base lines. These areas feature a food and beverage railing in front of each seat.

References

External links
 Official website

Northwoods League teams
Amateur baseball teams in Michigan
Sports in Battle Creek, Michigan